is a ground level passenger railway station shared by Nankai Electric Railway and West Japan Railway Company (JR West) located at Kansai International Airport in the town of Tajiri, Sennan District, Osaka Prefecture, Japan. The northern end of the platforms extends into the city of Izumisano.

Layout

The station has two island platforms, serving two tracks for each railway company. Each railway line concourse also has three elevators for the convenience of passengers traveling with bulky baggage.

Platforms

Nankai Rapi:t airport limited express trains depart mainly from Track 2.
Kansai Airport Limited Express Haruka trains depart mainly from Track 4.

Adjacent stations

History
The station opened on June 15, 1994, two and a half months before the opening of the airport. During this initial period, the station was open to the public; however only airport employees and related personnel were allowed to leave the station concourse (a similar situation to Umi-Shibaura Station in Tokyo).

Since the mid-2000s, there have been plans to link Kansai Airport Station and central Osaka by a new underground railway line tentatively called the Naniwasuji Line, which would run between Namba and Shin-Osaka. In 2010, government calculations indicated that the new line would reduce travel time from Umeda to Kansai Airport to as little as 41 minutes, versus the current 56–68 minutes. The station is also one of the proposed terminals for the high-speed Hokuriku Shinkansen line.

Station numbering was introduced to the JR Kansai Airport Line in March 2018 with Kansai Airport being assigned station number JR-S47.

The station was closed on 4 September 2018 due to the effects of Typhoon Jebi causing flooding around the airport complex and the Sky Gate Bridge R being damaged by an empty fuel tanker. It was reopened on 18 September 2018 following the resumption of train services to the airport.

Passenger statistics
In fiscal 2019, the JR West portion of the station was used by an average of 14,360 passengers daily (boarding passengers only), while the Nankai portion of the station was used by an average of 16,698 passengers daily during the same period..

Surrounding area
 Kansai International Airport

See also
 List of railway stations in Japan

External links

Nankai Railway homepage
JR West home page

References

Railway stations in Japan opened in 1994
Railway stations in Osaka Prefecture
Airport railway stations in Japan
Tajiri, Osaka